The 2013 DSA Senior Division is the 2013 season of the DSA Senior Division which is the third tier of the Indian football system and the top tier of the Delhi football system. The league began on 22 January 2013.

Format
The league will consist of two groups in the beginning stage, in which each group contains seven teams. After the first round is complete the top four clubs from each group are promoted to the next round of the league which will be played at the Ambedkar Stadium.

2013 DSA Senior Division Clubs

Preliminary round

Group A

Group B

Super League Round

Group A

Group B

Semi-finals

Final

References

3